Bligh Island may refer to several places named after British navigator William Bligh:
 Bligh Island (Alaska), Prince William Sound, Alaska
 Bligh Island (Canada), Nootka Sound, Canada
 Bligh Island,  Ureparapara, Banks group, Vanuatu